The Polebridge Ranger Station in Glacier National Park was the first administrative area in the park, predating the park's establishment.  The ranger station was destroyed by fire, leaving the residence.

The historic district originally comprised five cabins, a barn, oil house, a woodshed converted to a checking station, garage, generator house, fire cache, washhouse, and the Strissel Residence, moved to the site in 1975. Many of the other structures were moved to the site in 1955. The fire cache was built at the site in 1927, with a greater level of detailing than was usual in such structures. The 1927 log barn was a significant existing structure.

The only survivors of the 1988 Red Bench Fire were the checking station and the ranger station residence. The residence is a log structure, built in 1922.

References

Ranger stations in Glacier National Park (U.S.)
Park buildings and structures on the National Register of Historic Places in Montana
National Park Service rustic in Montana
Historic districts on the National Register of Historic Places in Montana
National Register of Historic Places in Flathead County, Montana
National Register of Historic Places in Glacier National Park
1922 establishments in Montana
Log buildings and structures on the National Register of Historic Places in Montana
Government buildings completed in 1922